The Whichcote Baronetcy, of the Inner Temple in the City of London, was a title in the Baronetage of England. It was created on 2 April 1660 to reward Jeremy Whichcote for his services to the exiled King Charles II. Whichcote, previously Solicitor-General to Prince Rupert of the Rhine, bought the post of Warden of Fleet Prison and, during the Commonwealth, was able to shelter the king's friends and agents in this way.

The third Baronet sat as Member of Parliament for Cambridgeshire. The seventh Baronet was High Sheriff of Lincolnshire in 1837. The ninth Baronet was High Sheriff of Lincolnshire in 1900. The title became extinct on the death of the tenth Baronet in 1949.

Benjamin Whichcote was the elder brother of the first Baronet.

Whichcote baronets, of the Inner Temple (1660)
Sir Jeremy Whichcote, 1st Baronet (–1677)
Sir Paul Whichcote, 2nd Baronet (1643–1721)
Sir Francis Whichcote, 3rd Baronet (–1775)
Sir Christopher Whichcote, 4th Baronet (1738–1786)

Sir Thomas Whichcote, 5th Baronet (1763–1828)
Sir Thomas Whichcote, 6th Baronet (1787–1829)
Sir Thomas Whichcote, 7th Baronet (1813–1892)
Sir George Whichcote, 8th Baronet (1817–1893)
Sir George Whichcote, 9th Baronet (1870–1946)
Sir Hugh Christopher Whichcote, 10th Baronet (1874–1949)

References

Extinct baronetcies in the Baronetage of England